Dana Taylor may refer to:

 Dana Taylor (Desperate Housewives), a character on US TV series Desperate Housewives
Dana Taylor, Playboy's Playmate of the month July 2017